HT Tatran Prešov is a handball club from Prešov, Slovakia, that plays in the Niké Handball Extraliga, SEHA League, EHF European League.

History

The official establishment of the club begins in 1952 under the name Slavia CSSA. In 1954, Tatran successfully qualified for the championship of Czechoslovakia, where they won their first historic bronze medal. In 1967, the national team of Czechoslovakia became world champion in Sweden. Four Tatran Presov players were in the national team at that time: Anton Frolo, Martin Gregor, Vladimir Seruga and Rudolf Horváth. In the 1968/1969 season, Tatran won its first Czechoslovak league title. The second golden record was brought immediately by the 1970/71 season. In the 1971/72 season, Tatran achieved its greatest international success, where it only reached the semi-finals of the European Champions Cup, where VfL Gummersbach defeated it in the fight to advance to the finals. After the independence of Slovakia, from the 1993/94 season, various lobby groups took turns in the management of the club. The most difficult period of men's handball in Eperjes has come, there were frequent personnel changes in the club management, financial conditions brought the club to the brink of collapse. Miloslav Chmeliar took over the club from the summer of 2001. From then on, the team became stronger financially and personally, and could finally operate under decent conditions. In recent years, Tatran has developed into the most successful and strongest club in Slovakia. In the last decade, the club has grown into a serial champion of its country.

Kits

Management

Team

Current squad 

Squad for the 2022–23 season

Technical staff
 Head Coach:  Marek Gernát
 Masseur:  Dávid Balucha
 Masseur:  Tomáš Foriš

Transfers

Transfers for the 2023–24 season

Joining 

Leaving

Previous Squads

Accomplishments
National Championship of Slovakia: (17) 
2004, 2005, 2007, 2008, 2009, 2010, 2011, 2012, 2013, 2014, 2015, 2016, 2017, 2018, 2019, 2021, 2022
National Cup of Slovakia: (24)
1971, 1974, 1975, 1976, 1978, 1981, 1982, 2002, 2004, 2005, 2007,2008, 2009, 2010, 2011, 2012, 2013, 2014, 2015, 2016, 2017, 2018, 2020, 2022
EHF Champions League
 1/8 Final (1): 2004/05
 Group Stage (5): 2005/06, 2007/08, 2008/09, 2010/11, 2015/16
EHF Cup
 1/4 Final: (1): 2011/12
 1/8 Final (1): 2009/10
 Group Phase: (1): 2012/13
 Qualification Round 3: (1): 2014/2015
EHF Cup Winners' Cup
 1/4 Final  (1): 2005/06
 1/8 Final (3): 2002/03, 2007/08, 2008/09

EHF ranking

Former club members

Notable former players

  Radoslav Antl (2004–2005, 2009–2016)
  Vlastimil Fuňák (2004–2009)
  Patrik Hruščák (2013–2014)
  Marián Huňady (2001–2010)
  Maroš Kolpak (1989–1993)
  Michal Kopčo (2011–2012, 2014–2016)
  Radoslav Kozlov (2005–2009)
  Peter Kukučka (2003–2005)
  Tomáš Mažár (2002–2013)
  Adam Mazúr (2005–2011)
  Radovan Pekár (1998–2018)
  Andrej Petro (2012–2016)
  Oliver Rábek (2012–)
  Tomáš Rečičár (2016–)
  Richard Štochl (1994–1998)
  Martin Straňovský (2018–2020)
  Lukáš Urban (2012–2020, 2022–)
  Tomáš Urban (2012–2015)
  Stefan Janković (2016–2018)
  Vladimir Božić (2015–2016)
  Bruno Butorac (2017–2019)
  Mario Cvitković (2017–2020)
  Leon Vučko (2016–2020)
  Tomáš Číp (2011–2019)
  Jakub Hrstka (2011–2019)
  Michal Kasal (2017–2019)
  Jakub Krupa (2008–2015)
  Alexander Radčenko (2007–2016, 2018-2022)
  Jan Sobol (2010–2011, 2012–2013)
  Sergo Datukashvili (2011)
  Dainis Krištopāns (2009–2015)
  Nikola Kosteski (2019)
  Žarko Pejović (2011–2014)
  Damian Krzysztofik (2014)
  Vasja Furlan (2014–2016)
  Matjaž Mlakar (2013–2014)
  Javier Muñoz (2019)
  Đorđe Golubović (2022–)
  Vojin Menkovič (2010–2011)
  Svetislav Verkić (2011–2015)
  Anouar Ben Abdallah (2020–2021)
  Jihed Jaballah (2020–2021)

Former coaches

References

External links
 Official website
 

 
Slovak handball clubs
Sport in Prešov
Sports clubs established in 1952
1952 establishments in Czechoslovakia